Ishkhanasar is a village in the Sisian Municipality of the Syunik Province in Armenia.

Etymology 
The village is named in honour of Nikoghayos Poghos Mikaelian (nom de guerre: Ishkhan), a resistance leader during the Armenian genocide.

Demographics 
The Statistical Committee of Armenia reported its population as 271 in 2010, up from 147 at the 2001 census.

Gallery

References 

Populated places in Syunik Province